De Groot is a surname of Dutch origin. 

Translating as "the great/big/large/tall" it originated as a nickname for a big or tall person. The name has sometimes been Latinized as Grotius, as in the case of Hugo Grotius. In 2007, there were 36,147 people with this surname in the Netherlands, making it the 13th most common surname in the country, and 1179 in Belgium. Less common variants are De Groote (729 in Netherlands, 5093 in Belgium), De Grooth (127, 0), Groot (9239, 43) and Groote (777, 2). The form "De Grote", matching modern Dutch grammar, is very rare (43 in the Netherlands only), and names like Karel de Grote tend to refer to historical figures called "the Great"", in this case Charlemagne. The agglutinated forms DeGroot and Degroot are mostly found abroad.

People with the name include:

Adriaan de Groot (1914–2006), Dutch chess master and psychologist
Adriaan de Groot (software developer) (born 1973), Canadian-born Dutch software engineer
Alejandro López de Groot (born 1993), Spanish footballer
Anne De Groot (born 1950s), American immunologist and entrepreneur
Barbara Hallquist DeGroot (born 1957), American tennis player
Bart de Groot (born 1990), Dutch footballer
Bob de Groot (born 1941), Belgian comic book writer
Boudewijn de Groot (born 1944), Dutch singer and songwriter
Bram de Groot (born 1974), Dutch road bicycle racer
Bruce DeGroot (born 1963), American politician in Missouri
Carlijn de Groot (born 1986), Dutch cricketer
Chad Degroot (born 1974), American bike motocross rider
Cor de Groot (1914–1993), Dutch pianist and composer
 (1546–1610), Dutch jurist
Cornelis Hofstede de Groot (1863–1930), Dutch art collector, art historian and museum curator
Daan de Groot (1933–1982), Dutch road and track cyclist
David de Groot (1871–1933), Dutch-born British violinist
Dick de Groot (born 1920), Dutch-born American painter
Diede de Groot (born 1996), Dutch tennis Grand Slam Champion
Dirk de Groot (born 1943), Dutch football player and coach
Donny de Groot (born 1979), Dutch footballer
Dudley DeGroot (1899–1970), American football player and coach
Edward Stanley de Groot (1894–1961), Irish-born violinist and entertainer known as Stanelli
 (born 1948), President of the Belgian Constitutional Court
Francis de Groot (1888–1969), Irish Colonel who "upstaged" New South Wales Premier, Jack Lang
Frederik de Groot (born 1946), Dutch actor
Guillaume de Groot (1836–1922), Belgian sculptor
 (1920–2004), Dutch composer, accordionist and singer
Hugo de Groot (Hugo Grotius) (1583–1645), Dutch jurist and poet
 (1897–1986), Dutch composer and conductor
Huug de Groot (1890–1957), Dutch footballer
Jan de Groot (1650–1726), Dutch painter
Jan Jakob Maria de Groot (1854–1921), Dutch Sinologist and historian of religion
Jannie de Groot (born 1930), Dutch swimmer
Jeanne Lampl-de Groot (1895–1987), Dutch psychiatrist 
Jeff DeGroot (born 1985), American soccer player
Joeri de Groot (born 1977), Dutch rower
Johannes de Groot (1914–1972), Dutch mathematician (topology)
Klaas de Groot (born 1940), Dutch biomedical engineer
Klaas de Groot (wrestler) (1919–1994), Dutch Greco-Roman wrestler
Leen de Groot (born 1946), Dutch racing cyclist
Luc(as) de Groot (born 1963), Dutch type designer
Marie-José de Groot (born 1966), Dutch rower
Morris H. DeGroot (1931–1989), American statistician
Myra De Groot (1937–1988), English-Australian actress
Nanno de Groot (1913–1963), Dutch-American abstract painter
Nicholas de Groot (born 1975), Canadian cricketer
Paul de Groot (1899–1986), Dutch communist politician
Petrus Hofstede de Groot (1802–1886), Dutch theologian
Pieter de Groot (1615–1678), Dutch regent and diplomat
Raphaëlle de Groot (born 1974),  Canadian artist and educator
Robyn de Groot (born 1987), South African road bicycle racer
Ron de Groot (born 1960), Dutch footballer
Roy Andries De Groot (1910–1983), British and American food writer
 (1916–1994), Dutch theoretical physicist
Sytske de Groot (born 1986), Dutch rower
Tom de Grooth (born 1979), Dutch cricketer
Tavish Finnegan DeGroot, fictional character from 2007 game Team Fortress 2

See also
DeGroot (disambiguation)

References 

Dutch-language surnames